Old Main at the Lutheran Home at Topton is the original building of the Lutheran Home overlooking the borough of Topton in Longswamp Township, Berks County, Pennsylvania.  The building was completed in 1899 as an orphanage.  In the 1940s the Lutheran Home began admitting retirees to live in the building as the number of orphans decreased.  The Lutheran Home is now operated by Diakon Lutheran Social Ministries. It was listed on the National Register of Historic Places in 2015

The building has a three stories constructed of brick.  Two wings were added in 1911, originally containing classrooms and dormitories.

References

Further reading

National Register of Historic Places in Berks County, Pennsylvania